The Jefferson City Bridge is the name for two continuous through arch truss bridges over the Missouri River at Jefferson City, Missouri, over which U.S. Routes 54 (US 54) and 63 travel between Cole and Callaway Counties.

Southbound bridge

The southbound bridge was designed by Sverdrup & Parcel of St Louis, Missouri, in 1953 and fabricated by Stupp Brokers Bridge & Iron Company.

The southbound bridge opened in August 1955, with a total length of 3,124.2 feet (0.6 miles), and the length of its largest span being 595.6 feet, with a deck width of 46.9 ft and vertical clearance of 16.1 feet above the deck.

As of 2018, the combined bridges see approximately 29,000 vehicle traversals per day.

Northbound bridge

The northbound bridge opened in 1991.

The northbound bridge has a cantilevered bicycle and pedestrian lane, opened in April 2011. It is used in both directions for river viewing and access to the Katy Trail State Park. A city-maintained extension of the Katy (following a former KATY railroad spur) connects to the North Jefferson trailhead.

1896 Bridge

The original bridge was built in 1896 and had three spans and was downstream of the current bridges. It had a single column in the middle of the river that rotated 90° to allow boat traffic to pass (the rotation could disrupt traffic for 45 minutes). The bridge was torn down in 1958. The pillars at the south entrance to the bridge are still in place, now a part of Rotary Park, overlooking the river at the end of Bolivar Street.

See also
 
 
 
 List of crossings of the Missouri River

References

Bridgehunter.com profile
Bridgehunter.com profile of first bridge

Buildings and structures in Jefferson City, Missouri
Road bridges in Missouri
U.S. Route 54
U.S. Route 63
Bridges of the United States Numbered Highway System
Through arch bridges in the United States
Truss bridges in the United States